Helenio Angel Herrera (born 27 January 1952), is a retired Spanish footballer who played as a forward.

Club career
Herrera signed for the New York Cosmos in 1972 from Spanish giants Real Madrid.

Personal life
Herrera is the son of legendary football manager of the same name, Helenio Herrera.

Career statistics

Club

Notes

References

1952 births
Living people
Footballers from Madrid
Spanish footballers
Association football forwards
North American Soccer League (1968–1984) players
A.S. Roma players
Real Madrid CF players
New York Cosmos players
Spanish expatriate footballers
Spanish expatriate sportspeople in Italy
Expatriate footballers in Italy
Spanish expatriate sportspeople in the United States
Expatriate soccer players in the United States